Eva Sadoun (born 30 August 1990) is a French entrepreneur and activist. She co-founded LITA.co, an equity crowdfunding platform dedicated to social entrepreneurship and to sustainable development. She is also the co-chair of the Impact France Movement, born from the merger of Tech For Good France and the Social Entrepreneurs Movement.

Biography 
Eva Sadoun was born in 1990 and grew up in Paris. She studied mathematics at the Paris-Nanterre University, and followed at the same time a preparatory class to the ENS Paris Saclay in economy and mathematics (formerly ENS Cachan). After a few experiences in charity work, she studied at Emlyon Business School and majored in finance and social impact measurement. She also studied philosophy at the Catholic Institute of Paris.

In 2009, She created an NGO dealing with education in Togo, and worked for a microfinance company in India. When she came back to France, Eva Sadoun joined the CSR team of a major French bank."

She co-founded in 2014 1001pact, a social and environmental impact investing platform. 1001pact became LITA.co in 2017 and exists now in France, Italy, Belgium.

In November 2020, she launched the mobile app Rift, a LITA.co subsidiary. The app allows its users, mainly savers, to understand how their savings are invested, to measure the social and environmental impact.

Other activities 
Eva Sadoun is the co-chair of the Impact France Movement. The movement, formerly known as the Social Entrepreneurs Movement, brings together the main players of social entrepreneurship in France. She is also the co-chair of the Tech For Good Collective, formerly known as France Eco-Sociale Tech. Tech For Good promotes technology and innovation at the service of common good and Sustainable Development Goals. Both collectives merged when Mouves became the Impact France Movement so they could open up to companies that were not from the Social Solidarity Economy but had started to commit to being socially and environmentally conscious.

She is also a spokesperson for the collective “Nous Sommes Demain” (We Are Tomorrow), that gathers companies with a social and environmental impact promoting a solidarity-based, ecological and inclusive economy

She also is an administrator of Finansol, an independent association under the law of 1901 that promotes solidarity-based finance.

She has also written several op-ed articles, including one during the Yellow vests movement, when the “French Tech 120” was nominated by the government, and during the COVID-19 pandemic.

References 

1990 births
Emlyon Business School alumni
Living people
French women activists